The 1913 Colorado Silver and Gold football team was an American football team that represented the University of Colorado as a member of the Rocky Mountain Conference (RMC) during the 1913 college football season. In its 13th year under head coach Fred Folsom, the team compiled a 5–1–1 record (4–0–1 against RMC opponents), won the conference championship, and outscored all opponents by a total of 82 to 33.

Schedule

References

Colorado
Colorado Buffaloes football seasons
Rocky Mountain Athletic Conference football champion seasons
Colorado Silver and Gold football